Walter Sidebottom (1 February 1921 – 23 October 1943) was an English professional footballer who played as a winger in the Football League for Bolton Wanderers.

Personal life
Sidebottom served as an able seaman in the Royal Navy during the Second World War. Posted aboard , he was killed in action when the ship was sunk by German torpedo-boat destroyers at the Battle of Sept-Îles on 23 October 1943. Sidebottom is commemorated on the Plymouth Naval Memorial.

Career statistics

References

1921 births
1943 deaths
People from Hunslet
Footballers from Leeds
Association football wingers
English footballers
English Football League players
Bolton Wanderers F.C. players
Bolton Wanderers F.C. wartime guest players
Royal Navy personnel killed in World War II
Deaths due to shipwreck at sea
Royal Navy sailors
Military personnel from Leeds